Edgar Cooper (12 November 1891 – 15 March 1959) was a Welsh cricketer.  Cooper was a right-handed batsman who bowled right-arm fast-medium.  He was born at Briton Ferry, Glamorgan.

Cooper made his debut for Glamorgan in the 1912 Minor Counties Championship against Monmouthshire at Cardiff Arms Park.  In 1913 he played a further Minor Counties match for Glamorgan against the same opposition.

He made his first-class debut for Glamorgan in 1921 against Sussex, in Glamorgan's inaugural first-class match.  He played 3 further first-class matches for the county in 1923, with his final match for Glamorgan coming against Worcestershire.  In his four first-class matches he scored 46 runs at a batting average of 5.75, with a high score of 14.  In the field he took three catches  With the ball he took 10 wickets at a bowling average of 40.60, with best figures of 4/61.

Cooper died at Kettering, Northamptonshire on 15 March 1959.

References

External links
Edgar Cooper at Cricinfo
Edgar Cooper at CricketArchive

1891 births
1959 deaths
Cricketers from Briton Ferry
Welsh cricketers
Glamorgan cricketers